Sarah Zelenka (born June 8, 1987) is an American rower. She was a member of the 2012 US Summer Olympic team, having competed in the women's pair race.

Biography 
Zelenka was born in Park Ridge, Illinois. She was a basketball player at Lake Park High School. She did not start rowing until her freshman year of college at Grand Valley State University. In 2008, Zelenka helped lead Grand Valley's women's eight to the American Collegiate Rowing Association national title. In the 2009 World Rowing Under-23 Championships, she finished sixth in the women's four.  In the 2010 World Rowing Cup, Zelenka won golds in the women's four and eight. At the 2011 World Rowing Championships, she won gold in the women's four. With partner Sara Hendershot, Zelenka won the U.S. Olympic trials for the women's pair to qualifying for the 2012 Summer Olympics. On July 28, 2012 Zelenka made it to the Olympic finals with a time of 6:59.29. In the finals, Sarah came in fourth with a time of 7:30.39.

References

Living people
1987 births
Grand Valley State University alumni
Olympic rowers of the United States
Sportspeople from Park Ridge, Illinois
Rowers at the 2012 Summer Olympics
American female rowers
World Rowing Championships medalists for the United States
American people of Czech descent
21st-century American women